Switzerland is a country in Europe.

Switzerland may also refer to:

Places
Switzerland, Florida, an unincorporated community
Switzerland County, Indiana, a county
Switzerland Township, Monroe County, Ohio, a civil township
Switzerland, South Carolina
Switzerland Island, an artificial island of The World archipelago in United Arab Emirates

Other uses
Switzerland (album), a 2006 album by Electric Six
Switzerland (software), a packet monitor tool for ISP testing

See also
Bohemian Switzerland, a region in the north-western Czech Republic
Franconian Switzerland, an upland in Upper Franconia, northern Bavaria
Holstein Switzerland, a hilly area in Schleswig-Holstein, Germany
Little Switzerland (disambiguation)
Norman Switzerland, a hilly area in Normandy, France
Saxon Switzerland, a mountainous area and national park near Dresden in Saxony, Germany